Meeson may refer to:

People 
 Alfred Meeson (1808–1885), British architect
 Dora Meeson (1869–1955), Australian artist
 John Meeson Parsons (1798–1870), English art collector
 Stuart Meeson (born 1972), English physicist

Other uses 
 Mr Meeson's Will, a novel by H. Rider Haggard